Stefan Schmitt may refer to:
Leo Stefan Schmitt, a German politician
Stefan Schmitt (footballer), a German footballer
Stefan Schmitt (politician), a German politician